The Grand Army of the Republic Hall is an historic clubhouse building, which is located in Johnstown, Cambria County, Pennsylvania.

It was added to the National Register of Historic Places in 1980.

History and architectural features
Built in 1893, the Grand Army of the Republic Hall, which is located in the Downtown Johnstown Historic District, is a three-story brick building with a flat roof, three bays by seven bays. The front facade features two carved stone insets with a cannon and crossed sword motif.

It was built by the local chapter of the Grand Army of the Republic and was subsequently converted to business office space.

The building was damaged in the Flood of 1977.

It was added to the National Register of Historic Places in 1980.

References

Pennsylvania
Clubhouses on the National Register of Historic Places in Pennsylvania
Cultural infrastructure completed in 1891
Buildings and structures in Johnstown, Pennsylvania
1891 establishments in Pennsylvania
National Register of Historic Places in Cambria County, Pennsylvania
Individually listed contributing properties to historic districts on the National Register in Pennsylvania
Pennsylvania in the American Civil War